Casole is a village (curazia) in the middle of San Marino. It belongs to the municipality of San Marino.

Geography
The village is situated near Murata and close to the borders of Fiorentino.

See also
San Marino (city)
Cà Berlone
Canepa
Castellaro
Montalbo
Murata
Santa Mustiola

Curazie in San Marino
Geography of the City of San Marino